Philotheca verrucosa, commonly known as fairy wax-flower or Bendigo wax-flower, is a species of flowering plant in the family Rutaceae and is endemic to south-eastern Australia. It is a small shrub with prominently glandular-warty branchlets, heart-shaped or egg-shaped leaves with the narrower end towards the base, and white flowers usually arranged singly in leaf axils.

Description
The leaves are flat or folded lengthwise. Flowering occurs from August to October.

Taxonomy
Fairy wax-flower was first formally described in 1834 by Achille Richard who gave it the name Erisotemon verrucosus in Voyage de découvertes de l'Astrolabe - Botanique. In 1998, Paul Wilson changed the name to Philotheca verrucosa in the journal Nuytsia.

Distribution and habitat
Philotheca verrucosa grows on rocky hills in forest and woodland, sometimes in sandy heathland and occurs in South Australia, Victoria and Tasmania. It is found in the Mount Lofty Ranges in South Australia, in the Grampians, Bendigo district and Gippsland in Victoria and in eastern Tasmania.

Use in horticulture
This philotheca can be grown from tip cuttings and is frost hardy and reasonably drought-tolerant. Some forms have double or multiple whorls of petals.

Philotheca 'Flower Girl' is a hybrid cultivar, thought to be a cross between this species and Philotheca myoporoides. It produces a profusion of light pink to white flowers during winter and spring and grows to between 1 and 2 metres high.

References

verrucosa
Flora of South Australia
Flora of Tasmania
Flora of Victoria (Australia)
Plants described in 1834
Sapindales of Australia
Taxa named by Achille Richard